Missouri State University–West Plains is a public community college in West Plains, Missouri. It is a separately accredited campus of Missouri State University. The fall 2018 enrollment was 1,869 students. Established in 1963, Missouri State University–West Plains currently has an open enrollment policy. It has an extended campus in Mountain Grove.

Academics 
The institution offers three Associate degrees: Associate of Arts, Associate of Science, and Associate of Applied Science.

Student life 
Missouri State University–West Plains offers a variety of activities for students, including Student Government Association, study-abroad programs and student organizations. Students can work out or play sports in the West Plains Civic Center gym or the Student Recreation Center, and can experience the arts at the programs featured at the Civic Center.

Athletics
Missouri State-West Plains Grizzly athletics include women's volleyball, men's basketball, and co-ed cheer teams. In the Fall of 2022 the university welcomed two new athletic events, Womens softball and E-Sports. Home games take place at the West Plain Civic Center Arena and the Richards field. The school competes in the Missouri Community College Athletic Conference.

Housing
The Grizzly House is Missouri State-West Plains' University's first residential facility, located in the heart of campus on Trish Knight Street. On January 1, 2017, the Shoe Factory Lofts, 665 Missouri Ave., in West Plains, became Grizzly Lofts, and Missouri State-West Plains manage the facility, which can accommodate 274 students.

References

External links
 Official website

Two-year colleges in the United States
Missouri State University
Buildings and structures in Howell County, Missouri
Education in Howell County, Missouri
Community colleges in Missouri
1963 establishments in Missouri